Point Dume is a promontory on the coast of Malibu, California that juts out into the Pacific Ocean.  The point, a long bluff, forms the northern end of the Santa Monica Bay.  Point Dume Natural Area affords a vista of the Palos Verdes Peninsula and Santa Catalina Island.  Zuma Beach lies to its immediate northwest.

History

Point Dume was named by George Vancouver in 1793 in honor of Padre Francisco Dumetz of Mission San Buenaventura. The name was misspelled on Vancouver's map as "Dume" and was never corrected. On a plat map of the Rancho Topanga Malibu Sequit finally confirmed to new owner Matthew Keller in August 1870, the point is marked on the map as "Point Zuma or Duma". In the early 1980s, real estate development interests began pronouncing the name "du-MAY" and spelling it "Dumé"; this did not catch on.
In the mid-1930s, the 900-ton steam-schooner California, of the California Whaling Company, would anchor in Paradise Cove about a mile offshore, near Point Dume, and process whales caught by her two "killer boats", the Hawk and Port Saunders. She spent about four months there each winter (December–April), mostly flensing gray whales on their annual migration from Alaska to Baja California and back. Emerson Gaze, a reporter who spent a day with the fleet, said they had caught over fifty whales up to late January 1936, nearly all gray (with the exception of a few humpback and sperm whales). Nial O’Malley Keyes, in his book Blubber Ship, reported large numbers of whales were caught within a mile of Malibu (in or before 1934), a reference to the Point Dume operation.

Up until the 1940s, Point Dume was a windblown, treeless bluff covered by native chaparral. Post-World War II the bluff became slowly settled by independent-minded people, who planted trees and other non-native flora among their single-family homesteads. In 1968, Point Dume Elementary School opened, but closed in 1980. It reopened in 1996 and remains open today, now known as the Point Dume Marine Science Elementary School. By 2007, many of the simple homesteads were torn down to make way for mansions and mega-mansions behind walls, many with expansive ocean views, while other large homes were surrounded by mature trees.

State preserve

The northwesternmost tip of Point Dume has been designated Point Dume Nature Preserve. Located along Cliffside Drive, very limited parking is available. Its beach is protected by the Lifeguard unit of the Los Angeles County Fire Department. 

The cove, located just south of the point, was a popular clothing-optional meeting spot in the 1960s and '70s.

Rock climbing 

Point Dume is home to a handful of very moderate single pitch rock climbing routes that are usually climbed on top rope from established fixed anchors. It is a common place to take novice climbers due to the ease of access,  ease of routes, as well as the beautiful and unique setting for rock climbing.

Filming location

With its close proximity to the film and television industry location, Point Dume's Westward Beach continues to be a popular filming location for films, television, advertisements, and videos, appearing frequently whenever a beach scene is needed.

Jackie Treehorn’s beach party in The Big Lebowski was filmed near the cliff face.

Important scenes in the Planet of the Apes series were filmed at Point Dume's Westward Beach, including the surprise ending of the first film.

In the Iron Man films set in the Marvel Cinematic Universe, the protagonist Tony Stark's huge seaside mansion was set on Point Dume at the edge of a cliff overlooking the Pacific Ocean, and was given the fictional address of 10880 Malibu Point, 90265. The interior shots were filmed on real sets, but the mansion itself is fictional, instead being created as a 3D model and digitally placed on the cliffs in post-production; Point Dume is a protected area, so construction on its cliffs is strictly prohibited.

The ashes of American horror movie actor Vincent Price were scattered here in 1993.

The music video "Sandcastles in the Sand" for the TV show How I Met Your Mother was filmed on Point Dume State Beach.

The season 3 finale of Angel was set on cliffs above Point Dume State Beach, but was filmed to the west at Leo Carrillo State Park.

The TV series Son of the Beach was frequently filmed on Point Dume State Beach.

An episode of the television series Modern Family was filmed on Point Dume State Beach.

The pilot episode of I Dream of Jeannie was filmed at Point Dume, which served as the deserted South Pacific island where astronaut Tony Nelson's (Larry Hagman) capsule washed ashore and he released Jeannie (Barbara Eden) from 2,000 years of imprisonment.

The wedding in the season 2 finale of Chuck was filmed on Point Dume State Beach.

The season 1 episode "Dominoes" of the television series Scorpion was mostly set at Point Dume.

In 1984 and 1988, Point Dume stood in for Stefano DiMera's underground cliff base on the daytime drama Days of Our Lives.

In season 2 of The Last Man on Earth, the home in Malibu where the characters live is (fictitiously) set on Point Dume.

Point Dume was featured in season 5 episode 8 of baywatch when two contestants have to be rescued by Matt Brody

California Historical Landmark
California Historical Marker on the site reads:
NO. 965 POINT DUME - On November 24, 1793, English explorer George Vancouver, commander of an expedition to determine the extent of settlement of the northwest coast of America, named this rocky promontory, Point Dume, after his Franciscan friend, Father Francisco Dumetz, at Mission San Buenaventura. Point Dume is the western terminus of Santa Monica Bay and has been an important landmark for navigators since Vancouver's voyage in 1793.

See also
List of beaches in California
List of California state parks
California Historical Landmarks in Los Angeles County

References

External links 
 Point Dume State Beach

Malibu, California
Beaches of Southern California
California State Reserves
Peninsulas of California
Beaches of Los Angeles County, California
Climbing areas of California
Parks in Los Angeles County, California
Regional parks in California
Santa Monica Mountains
California State Beaches
Tourist attractions in Malibu, California